Pascack Brook is a tributary of the Hackensack River in Bergen County, New Jersey, United States.

History 
At least one late 18th-century map calls the brook "Great Pascack River." Its tributary Musquapsink Brook is shown as "Little Pascack River."  The name "Pascack River" also occurs in an 1876 map of the area.

Course and watershed 
Pascack Brook forms a region known as the Pascack Valley.  The brook is dammed to form the Woodcliff Lake Reservoir in the town of Woodcliff Lake.  The Pascack formerly flowed directly into the Hackensack River, but now ends at the Oradell Reservoir short of its historical juncture with the Hackensack.

A dam on Pascack Brook in Spring Valley, New York, impounded Lake Hyenga until it collapsed during Hurricane Floyd in September 1999. Heavy flooding resulted downstream. The dam was not rebuilt.

Tributaries
(Listed from mouth to source)
 Musquapsink Brook
 Tandy Brook
 Bear Brook
 Mill Brook
 Muddy Brook

See also
 List of rivers of New Jersey
 Pascack Brook County Park

References

External links
U.S. Geological Survey: NJ stream gaging stations

Rivers of Bergen County, New Jersey
Hackensack River
Pascack Valley
Rivers of New Jersey